Yarram was a railway station on the Woodside railway line. The railway opened to Yarram on 8 February 1921. After the 1940s it was the only station on the Woodside line to remain open, effectively making it the terminus station of the South Gippsland line. It closed during the late 1980s, along with Alberton and Welshpool stations.

The station closed to passenger service, when the new V/Line deal came in 1981.  Steamrail Victoria ran the last rail enthusiasts train trip to Yarram on Saturday 24 October 1987, which was hauled by a Victorian Railways K Class locomotive (K153) with 7 wooden carriages. The line was closed on Monday 26 October, which saw the local freight services cease between Welshpool - Yarram, six years after passenger services were cut.  The line limit was to Welshpool after 1987.  The track from Barry Beach Junction - Yarram was removed a few years before the track was removed from Leongatha - Welshpool and Agnes (Barry Beach Junction) - Barry Beach in 1994.

After several years of disuse, Yarram Station's Goods Shed was converted into a youth  centre to re-engage young people with education and community. This youth centre ceased operation after several successful years of catering to the needs of the youth of the district. Currently only a small section of the Goods Shed remains and has been converted into a covered area with tables for picnickers to use. This is the only remaining building of the once thriving Yarram Station. The land where the rail line ran between the site of Yarram Railway Station and the neighbouring township of Alberton, is now the Tarra Rail Trail walking trail which consists of a man made wetlands, outdoor exercise equipment, a skatepark and approximately 7km of walking track.

References 

Disused railway stations in Victoria (Australia)
Transport in Gippsland (region)
Shire of Wellington